Gastambide is a surname and may refer to:

Franck Gastambide (born 1978), French TV and film director
Guillermo Díaz Gastambide (born 1979), Uruguayan footballer

See also
Gastambide-Mengin monoplane, an early French experimental aircraft designed by Léon Levavasseur